is the performing name of Kenji Watanabe. He has also provided the ending themes for Arakawa Under the Bridge and Arakawa Under the Bridge x Bridge, namely  and  respectively. More recently, he provided the ending theme to the Anime Sukitte Ii na yo, .

Discography

Independent albums

Studio albums

Tundra

Mini-albums

Major label albums

Studio albums

Mini-albums

Compilation albums
2009 – BEST

Singles

References

1971 births
Living people
Musicians from Niigata Prefecture
People from Nagaoka, Niigata
20th-century Japanese musicians
20th-century Japanese male musicians
21st-century Japanese musicians
21st-century Japanese male musicians